Mariusz Muszalik (born September 23, 1979 in Katowice) is a Polish footballer who currently plays for CKS Czeladź.

Career

Club
He was released from Piast Gliwice on 1 July 2011.

In July 2011, he joined Olimpia Elbląg on a one-year contract.

References

External links
 

1979 births
Living people
Sportspeople from Katowice
Polish footballers
Ekstraklasa players
Piast Gliwice players
Odra Wodzisław Śląski players
Dyskobolia Grodzisk Wielkopolski players
GKS Katowice players
Olimpia Elbląg players
Ruch Radzionków players
Association football midfielders